Božena Ecksteinová-Hniličková (7 March 1871 – 22 May 1930) was a Czechoslovakian politician. In 1920 she was one of the first group of women elected to the Senate, remaining in parliament until 1929.

Biography
Ecksteinová was born into a working-class family in the Smíchov district of Prague in 1871. After leaving school, she worked in a printing house. She joined the Czechoslavonic Social Democratic Workers' Party (ČSDSD) at the turn of the century, rising to become its treasurer. She helped found the Jubilee Study Fund that provided bursaries to party members, chaired the Greater Prague Trust Committee and was appointed to the Permanent Consumer Survey at the Ministry of Supply.

She was subsequently a ČSDSD candidate for the Senate in the 1920 parliamentary elections, and was one of sixteen women elected to parliament. When the party split in the early 1920s, she took over the its daily newspaper, . She was re-elected in 1925, serving until 1929 when she left politics due to illness. She died in Prague the following year.

References

1871 births
Politicians from Prague
Czechoslovak women in politics
Members of the Senate of Czechoslovakia (1920–1925)
Members of the Senate of Czechoslovakia (1925–1929)
Czech Social Democratic Party politicians
1930 deaths